The 1986 All-Big Ten Conference football team consists of American football players chosen as All-Big Ten Conference players for the 1986 NCAA Division I-A football season.

Three players were unanimously chosen as first-team players by the Associated Press media panel: quarterback Jim Harbaugh, receiver Cris Carter, and linebacker Chris Spielman.

Conference co-champions Michigan and Ohio State led the conference with seven first-team players each.  Michigan's first-team selections included Harbaugh, Jumbo Elliott, Mark Messner and Andy Moeller.  Ohio State's first-team selections included unanimous choices Carter and Spielman. Iowa followed with four first-team honorees, including running back Rick Bayless.

Offensive selections

Quarterbacks
 Jim Harbaugh, Michigan (AP-1; UPI-1)
 Jim Karsatos, Ohio State (AP-2)

Running backs
 Darrell Thompson, Minnesota (AP-1; UPI-1)
 Rick Bayless, Iowa (AP-1)
 Jamie Morris, Michigan (AP-2; UPI-1)
 Larry Emery, Wisconsin (AP-2)

Centers
 Bob Maggs, Ohio State (AP-1; UPI-1)
 Ray Hitchcock, Minnesota (AP-2)

Guards
 Mark Hammerstein, Michigan (AP-1; UPI-1)
 Jeff Uhlenhake, Ohio State (AP-1)
 Bob Kratch, Iowa (UPI-1)
 Troy Wolcrow, Minnesota (AP-2)
 Scott Kehoe, Illinois (AP-2)

Tackles
 Dave Croston, Iowa (AP-1; UPI-1)
 Jumbo Elliott, Michigan (AP-1; UPI-1)
 Jim Hobbins, Minnesota (AP-2)
 Bob Riley, Indiana (AP-2)

Tight ends
 Ed Taggert, Ohio State (AP-1)
 Rich Borresen, Northwestern (AP-2; UPI-1)

Receivers
 Cris Carter, Ohio State (AP-1; UPI-1)
 Andre Rison, Michigan State (AP-1; UPI-1)
 Mark Ingram Sr., Michigan State (AP-2)
 Stephen Pierce, Illinois (AP-2)

Defensive selections

Linemen-outside linebackers
 Jeff Drost, Iowa (AP-1; UPI-1)
 Eric Kumerow, Ohio State (AP-1; UPI-1)
 Van Waiters, Indiana (AP-1; UPI-1)
 Dave Haight, Iowa (AP-1)
 Mark Messner, Michigan (AP-1)
 Bob Dirkes, Northwestern (AP-2)
 John Budde, Michigan State (AP-2)
 Kevin Holley, Purdue (AP-2)
 Mark Nichols, Michigan State (AP-2)
 Darryl Lee, Ohio State (AP-2)

Linebackers
 Andy Moeller, Michigan (AP-1; UPI-1)
 Chris Spielman, Ohio State (AP-1; UPI-1)
 Shane Bullough, Michigan State (AP-2; UPI-1)
 Bruce Holmes, Minnesota (AP-2; UPI-1)
 Michael Reid, Wisconsin (AP-1)
 Fred Strickland, Purdue (AP-2)

Defensive backs
 Nate Odomes, Wisconsin (AP-1; UPI-1)
 Rod Woodson, Purdue (AP-1; UPI-1)
 Garland Rivers, Michigan (AP-2; UPI-1)
 Sonny Gordon, Ohio State (AP-1)
 Leonard Bell, Indiana (AP-2)
 Alex Green, Indiana (AP-2)

Special teams

Kickers
 John Duvic, Northwestern (AP-1)
 Chip Lohmiller, Minnesota (UPI-1)
 Rob Houghtlin, Iowa (AP-2)

Punters
 Greg Montgomery, Michigan State (AP-1; UPI-1)
 Tom Tupa, Ohio State (AP-2)

Key
AP = Associated Press, selected by a panel of 17 sports writers and broadcasters covering the Big Ten

UPI = United Press International, selected by the conference coaches

Bold = Consensus first-team selection of both the AP and UPI

See also
1986 College Football All-America Team

References

All-Big Ten Conference
All-Big Ten Conference football teams